With Dave Holland and Elvin Jones is the 14th album by Bill Frisell to be released on the Elektra Nonesuch label. It was released in 2001 and features performances by Frisell, bassist Dave Holland and drummer Elvin Jones.

Reception
The AllMusic review by John Duffy awarded the album 3.5 stars, stating, "What can you expect but good things from a date featuring three players of such high pedigree. With Dave Holland and Elvin Jones representing the steadfast rhythm sections of old, and with Frisell's post-modern tones being among the finest voices moving jazz forward, a date like this should easily yield some classic moments. But Frisell comes up with only partial melodies and bare bones sketches for the band to play. Jones sounds at times utterly bored with his rhythm duties, desperate for a chance to stretch out. Frisell himself is often hesitant. Henry Mancini's "Moon River" and Stephen Foster's century-and-a-half old "Hard Times" together offer brief glimpses of levity, but cannot save the set entirely." The Penguin Guide to Jazz described the album as "A dull, sketchy, supergroup encounter, and Jones can rarely have sounded as lacklustre."

Track listing
All compositions by Bill Frisell except as indicated.
 "Outlaws" – 7:55 
 "Twenty Years" – 3:15
 "Coffaro's Theme" – 4:50
 "Blue's Dream" – 4:49
 "Moon River" (Mancini, Mercer) – 6:25
 "Tell Your Ma, Tell Your Pa" – 9:06 
 "Strange Meeting" – 5:22
 "Convict 13" – 3:54
 "Again" – 7:32
 "Hard Times" (Stephen Foster) – 3:39 
 "Justice and Honor" – 4:48 
 "Smilin' Jones" – 5:03

Personnel
Bill Frisell - guitars
Dave Holland - bass
Elvin Jones - drums

References 

2001 albums
Bill Frisell albums
Collaborative albums
Nonesuch Records albums